The  is a local museum in Ishikari, Hokkaidō, Japan. With the decline of the industry in the 1950s, the building fell into a state of disrepair. Upon the merger of Hamamasu into Ishikari, the museum assumed its current identity. The building has been designated a Municipal Tangible Cultural Property and in 2006 was selected as one of the nation's 100 Fishing Village Heritage Sites. The collection includes tools and materials relating to the history of the local fishing industry.

See also
 List of Cultural Properties of Japan - structures (Hokkaidō)
 List of Historic Sites of Japan (Hokkaidō)

References

External links
  Ishikari City Hamamasu Folk Museum

Museums in Hokkaido
Museums established in 1971
1971 establishments in Japan
Ishikari, Hokkaido